The Houston tunnel system is a network of subterranean, climate-controlled, pedestrian walkways that links 95 full city blocks  below Houston's downtown streets. There are similar systems in Chicago, Dallas, Oklahoma City, Montreal, and Toronto. Architectural historian Stephen Fox has stated that the idea for the tunnel system came when the Bank of the Southwest Building was "linked by tunnel to the 1010 Garage and the Mellie Esperson Building" in 1961.

Description
The Tunnel is a series of underground passageways that, with above-ground skywalks, link office towers to hotels, banks, corporate and government offices, restaurants, retail stores, and the Houston Theater District. Portions of the tunnel contain gift shops, newsstands, banks, technology centers, flower shops, copy centers, dry cleaners, and food courts similar to a major shopping mall. They are widely and heavily used by office workers and tourists. Only two buildings, Wells Fargo Plaza and McKinney Garage on Main, offer direct access from the street to the Tunnel; other entry points are from street-level stairs, escalators, and elevators inside buildings that are connected to the tunnel. Access is allowed to the general public into these buildings with few restrictions, during normal operating hours, in order to reach the Tunnel.

Most of the retail areas of the Tunnel are in the basements of these buildings, connected by passageways. While walking through, one can determine which building one is in by the unique signage and/or architectural design of that building, as well as the wayfinding system and Houston Tunnel maps. Most of the Tunnel is in the western half of downtown Houston. The tunnel is generally open during weekday business hours only.

The Tunnel has been criticized for its numerous stairways, especially in the northern portion, which make wheelchair use impractical in some locations. Bob Eury director of the Houston Downtown District, stated that, "These areas haven't been made ADA-compliant because it would be difficult or impossible to put in ramps and still leave enough headroom for pedestrians."

Discontinuous portions

The Harris County tunnel at the far north side of downtown is not connected to the rest of the system by either tunnels or skywalks. It connects Harris County courts, jails, and associated buildings totaling 10 blocks. Six blocks of the St. Joseph Medical Center are connected via skywalks at the southeast corner of downtown near the Pierce elevated.

The Houston Chronicle complex, at 801 North Texas, was connected to the Tunnel until those buildings were imploded in 2017; the newspaper's operations relocated to the former Houston Post complex (off the Southwest Freeway) in 2014.

Other parts not connected to the main Tunnel are the skywalk connections between the Hilton-Americas Hotel and George R. Brown Convention Center, the skywalk connections at the Toyota Center, and at the Houston Public Library.

Buildings connected 
This is a partial listing.
1001 McKinney
1600 Smith
1400 Smith
1100 Louisiana
1111 Travis
1500 Louisiana
Esperson - 808 Travis/815 Walker
Commerce Towers
 Calpine Center
 JPMorgan Chase Tower
 Bank of America Center
 Pennzoil Place
 One Shell Plaza
 The Esperson buildings
 Wells Fargo Bank Plaza
 Centerpoint Energy Plaza
 Kinder Morgan Building
 Total Plaza
 One Houston Center
 First City Tower
 One Allen Center
 Wedge International Tower
 BG Group Place
 1111 Fannin

Flooding
The tunnels, being underground, are prone to flooding. They serve as channels for floodwater, allowing it to move through the tunnels from flooded buildings to unflooded buildings, flooding buildings that would not have been flooded otherwise. After Tropical Storm Allison, some of the buildings installed floodgates to prevent another occurrence of tunnel flooding.

References

External links

Map in PDF format
Detailed Houston Tunnel map in Adobe Flash
Mobile applications providing offline maps of Houston Tunnels

Underground cities
Tunnels in Texas
Transportation buildings and structures in Houston
Downtown Houston
Pedestrian tunnels in the United States